Joseph Patrick MacDonald, A.S.C. (December 15, 1906 - May 26, 1968) was a Mexico-born American cinematographer. An assistant cameraman from the early 1920s, he became a cinematographer in the 1940s and soon was working on Hollywood productions, mostly at 20th Century Fox. He was usually billed as Joe MacDonald.  He was the first Mexico-born cinematographer, and only the second overall, after Leon Shamroy, to film a movie in CinemaScope (How to Marry a Millionaire), as well as the first Mexico-born cinematographer to film a movie in Deluxe Color.

Select filmography

 Charlie Chan in Rio (1941)
 Little Tokyo, U.S.A. (1942)
 Wintertime (1943)
 Quiet Please, Murder (1943)
 Sunday Dinner for a Soldier (1944)
 In the Meantime, Darling (1944)
 The Big Noise (1944)
 Captain Eddie (1945)
 My Darling Clementine (1946)
 Shock (1946)
 The Dark Corner (1946)
 Wake Up and Dream (1946)
 Behind Green Lights (1946)
 Moss Rose (1947)
 Call Northside 777 (1948)
 The Street with No Name (1948)
 Down to the Sea in Ships (1949)
 Yellow Sky (1949)
 It Happens Every Spring (1949)
 Pinky (1949)
 Stella (1950)
 Panic in the Streets (1950)
 As Young as You Feel (1951)
 You're in the Navy Now (1951)
 Fourteen Hours (1951)
 Viva Zapata! (1952)
 What Price Glory (1952)
 O. Henry's Full House (1952)
 Niagara (1953)
 Pickup on South Street (1953)
 How to Marry a Millionaire (1953)
 Titanic (1953)
 Broken Lance (1954)
 Woman's World (1954)
 Hell and High Water (1954)
 The Racers (1955)
 House of Bamboo (1955)
 Hilda Crane (1956)
 On the Threshold of Space (1956)
 Teenage Rebel (1956)
 The True Story of Jesse James (1956)
 Bigger Than Life (1956)
 Will Success Spoil Rock Hunter? (1957)
 A Hatful of Rain (1957)
 The Fiend Who Walked the West (1958)
 Ten North Frederick (1958)
 The Young Lions (1958)
 Warlock (1959)
 Pepe (1960)
 The Gallant Hours (1960)
 The Last Time I Saw Archie (1961)
 40 Pounds of Trouble (1962)
 Taras Bulba (1962)
 Walk on the Wild Side (1962)
 Kings of the Sun (1963)
 The List of Adrian Messenger (1963)
 Invitation to a Gunfighter (1964)
 The Carpetbaggers (1964)
 Rio Conchos (1964)
 Flight from Ashiya (1964)
 Where Love Has Gone (1964)
 The Reward (1965)
 Mirage (1965)
 Alvarez Kelly (1966)
 The Sand Pebbles (1966)
 Blindfold (1966)
 A Guide for the Married Man (1967)
 Mackenna's Gold (1969)

Accolades
Nominations
 Academy Awards: Oscar, Best Cinematography, Black-and-White, for The Young Lions; 1959.
 Academy Awards: Oscar, Best Cinematography, for Pepe; 1961.
 Academy Awards: Oscar, Best Cinematography, for The Sand Pebbles; 1967.

References

External links
 
 
 

1906 births
1968 deaths
American cinematographers
People from Mexico City
Mexican emigrants to the United States